Florida Atlantic University High School (FAU High School) is a public, dual enrollment high school on the campus of Florida Atlantic University in Boca Raton, Florida. FAU High School is unique by the advanced coursework and classroom setting that students participate in. 9th grade at FAU High School prepares all students to transition to Florida Atlantic University, as 10th graders, where they complete the rest of their high school coursework and begin their undergraduate degrees in a major of their choosing. A typical graduate of FAU High School earns three years worth of college credits towards a bachelor's degree.

Sports
 Track and Field
 Cross Country
 Soccer
 Lacrosse
 Basketball
 Volleyball
 Flag Football

References

Public high schools in Florida
Educational institutions established in 2004
2004 establishments in Florida
Florida Atlantic University